Mariyam Vannu Vilakkoothi is an Indian Malayalam-language stoner film   written and directed by debutant Jenith Kachappilly and produced by Rajesh Augustine under the banner of ARK Media. The film starring Siju Wilson, Krishna Shankar, Shabareesh Varma and Althaf Salim, follows Unni and his friends who are staying as paying guests at Mariyamma's home. Debutants Wazim-Murali composed the music. Sidhartha Siva and Basil Joseph play other important roles.

The film was theatrically released on 31 January 2020.

Plot 

Three friends, all the way from their school days and are still together, working in the same company. The problems start when the trio decided to celebrate their colleague's birthday at the place where he stays as a paying guest.

Cast 
 Siju Wilson
 Krishna Shankar
 Shabareesh Varma
 Althaf Salim
 M. A. Shiyas
 Sethu Lakshmi
 Irena Mihalkovich
 Sidhartha Siva
 Baiju Santhosh
 Basil Joseph
 Abu Salim

Soundtrack
The songs and score are composed by debutants Wazim and Murali.

Release
The film was theatrically released on 31 January 2020.

References

External links
 
 

2020 directorial debut films
2020 films
Indian comedy thriller films
2020s Malayalam-language films
2020 comedy films
2020 thriller films
2020s comedy thriller films